The men's 20 kilometre individual biathlon competition at the 1994 Winter Olympics was held on 20 February, at Birkebeineren Ski Stadium.  Each miss resulted in one minute being added to a competitor's skiing time.

Results

References

Men's biathlon at the 1994 Winter Olympics